Jacob Mantino ben Samuel (died 1549) was a Jewish scholar and Italian physician, known also as Mantinus.

His parents—and perhaps Mantino himself—were natives of Tortosa, Spain, which place they left at the time of the banishment of the Jews from Spain (1492). Mantino studied medicine and philosophy at the universities of Padua and Bologna. Having graduated, he established himself at the latter place, and devoted his hours of leisure to the translation of scientific works from Hebrew into Latin. By these translations he soon acquired a high reputation, and he was befriended by the highest dignitaries of the court of Pope Clement VII.

 
The war of 1527 compelled Mantino to leave the Pontifical States. He settled at Verona, where the new bishop, Gian Matteo Giberti, protected him. In 1528, when Giberti left Verona for Rome, Mantino decided to settle at Venice, where the Council of Ten exempted him from wearing the Judenhut. This privilege was granted him, at first for a term of several months, upon the recommendation of the French and English ambassadors, the papal legate, and other dignitaries whom he numbered among his patients. At the expiration of the prescribed term Mantino found an influential protector in another of his patients, Teodoro Trivulzio, marshal of France and governor of Genoa; the latter, urging his own services to the Venetian Republic, insisted that the council should make the exemption perpetual.

The efforts of Henry VIII of England to get rid of his wife Catherine on the pretext that their marriage was contrary to the Biblical law, and that the dispensation obtained from Pope Julius II was invalid, involved Mantino in difficulties. Henry sent Richard Croke to Italy in order to obtain opinions favorable to his case, and the latter addressed himself to Jewish as well as to Christian scholars. Pope Clement VII, in his turn, consulted Mantino, who decided against Henry. This decision created for Mantino many enemies in Venice, where Croke had won a favorable opinion from the famous physician and scholar Elijah Menahem Halfon, among others.

Meanwhile, the Messianic dreamer Solomon Molcho, whom Mantino had energetically opposed while he was in Venice, went to Rome, followed by Mantino. Having many friends and protectors at the court of Clement VII, Mantino soon acquired great influence in Rome, which he employed in crushing Molcho. Mantino attained the zenith of his influence at the accession to the throne of Pope Paul III (1534), who appointed him his physician. This high position did not prevent Mantino from concerning himself with the affairs of the Jewish community of Rome, in whose records he appears as a member of the rabbinate, with the title "gaon." In 1544, for some unknown reason, Mantino returned to Venice, where again he was exempted from wearing the Jews' hat. Five years later he accompanied, as physician, the Venetian ambassador to Damascus, where he died soon after his arrival.

Writings
Mantino translated the following commentaries of Averroes: 
 "Paraphrasis Averrois de Partibus et Generatione Animalium," with the commentary of Levi ben Gershon (dedicated to Pope Leo X.; Rome, 1521); 
 commentary (the compendium) on Aristotle's "Metaphysics"; 
 the "middle commentaries" on Aristotle's "Isagoge"—books i.-iv. of "Topics" and "Poetics" (Venice, 1550); 
 commentary on Plato's "Republic" (dedicated to Pope Paul III.); 
 proem to the large commentary on Aristotle's "Physics"; 
 the large commentary on the third book of Aristotle on the soul; 
 proem to book xii. of Aristotle's "Meta-physics"; 
 the "middle commentary" on Aristotle's "Physics." 
He translated also Averroes' medical work "Colliget" ("Kullayot"), the first book of Avicenna's "Canon," and Maimonides' "Shemonah Peraḳim."

References
Wolf, Bibl. Hebr. i. 606;
Wüstenfeld, Die Uebersetzungen Arabischer Werke in das Lateinische seit dem XI. Jahrhundert, pp. 123 et seq.;
Steinschneider, in Zunz Jubelschrift, pp. 13, 20;
idem, Cat. Bodl. col. 1235;
idem, Hebr. Uebers. pp. 145, 438, 673, 685, 976;
Kaufmann, in R. E. J. xxvii. 30 et seq.;
Il Vessillo Israelitico, 1885, p. 317;
Filippo Maria Renazzi, Storia dell' Università degli Studi di Roma, ii. 110;
 and Paul Rieger, Geschichte der Juden in Rom, ii. 94 et seq.
Link to Jewish Encyclopedia article

Jacob Mantino | Galeria de Metges Catalans

1549 deaths
16th-century Sephardi Jews
16th-century Jewish physicians
16th-century Italian physicians
16th-century Italian Jews
Italian people of Spanish descent
Italian Sephardi Jews
Jews expelled from Spain in 1492
Year of birth unknown
Medieval Jewish physicians
16th-century Italian writers
16th-century male writers
16th-century translators